Jan Washausen (born 12 October 1988) is a German professional footballer who plays as a defender or midfielder for New York International in the Cosmopolitan Soccer League.

Career 
Washausen, made his debut in senior football in 2007 for Eintracht Braunschweig, in a first round match of the DFB-Pokal against Werder Bremen. He was used mostly as a back-up in Braunschweig, making 72 appearances in eight seasons for the club. In January 2013 Washausen went out on a six-month loan to Kickers Offenbach. After returning from his loan spell, he made his Bundesliga debut for newly promoted Eintracht Braunschweig on 19 October 2013, in a home game against Schalke 04.

In 2015, Washausen joined Regionalliga Südwest side SV Elversberg.

Washausen joined American amateur club New York International FC on 14 April 2022.

References

External links 
 

1988 births
Living people
Sportspeople from Göttingen
Footballers from Lower Saxony
German footballers
Association football defenders
Association football midfielders
Bundesliga players
2. Bundesliga players
3. Liga players
Regionalliga players
Eintracht Braunschweig players
Eintracht Braunschweig II players
Kickers Offenbach players
SV Elversberg players
FSV Zwickau players
Hallescher FC players